Hazel Tubic (born 31 December 1990) is a New Zealand-based rugby union player. She represents New Zealand internationally and was a member of their 2017 and 2021 Rugby World Cup champion sides. She plays for Chiefs Manawa in the Super Rugby Aupiki competition.

Rugby career

2011–2017 
Tubic made her test debut for the Black Ferns in 2011 against England. She has also represented New Zealand in rugby sevens. She was named in the squad for the 2017 Women's Rugby World Cup.

2022–2023 
Tubic was named in the Chiefs squad for the inaugural season of Super Rugby Aupiki in 2022. She was called in as an injury replacement for the Black Ferns squad to the 2022 Pacific Four Series. In August, she was recalled into the team for the two-test series against Australia for the Laurie O'Reilly Cup.

Tubic made the Black Ferns 32-player squad for the 2021 Rugby World Cup.

References

External links 
 Hazel Tubic at Black Ferns

1990 births
Living people
New Zealand women's international rugby union players
New Zealand female rugby union players
New Zealand female rugby sevens players
New Zealand women's international rugby sevens players
Rugby union fullbacks
Auckland rugby union players